The following is a list of ingredients used in Japanese cuisine.

Plant sources

Cereal grain
Rice
Short or medium grain white rice. Regular (non-sticky) rice is called .
Mochi rice (glutinous rice)-sticky rice, sweet rice
 (brown rice)
Rice bran – not usually eaten itself, but used for pickling, and also added to boiling water to parboil tart vegetables
 – Aspergillus cultures

 
  (barley)

Flour
 starch – an alternative ingredient for potato starch
 – soybean flour/meal
 – (millet) flour
 – starch powder
 starch
Rice flour

Medium fine ground types are called  and used as breaded crust or for confection. Fine ground are 
,  – powdery starch made from sticky rice.
 flour
Soba flour
 starch – substitutes are sold under this name, though authentic starch derives from fern roots. See 
Wheat flour
Tempura flour
 – name for the starch of rice or wheat. In Chinese cuisine, it is used to make the translucent skin of the shrimp .

Noodles

 Soba
 
 Ramen
 Udon
  noodles

Vegetables

Botanic fruits as vegetables
 Cucumber
 Eggplant
  – mild peppers
 
  – pumpkins, squash
  – type of squash/melon.

Cabbage family
  – (B. rapa var. perviridis)
  - (B. rapa var. nipposinica)
 Napa cabbage – (B. rapa var. glabra)
  – (Brassica juncea var. integrifolia or var. of mustard)
  – (cultivar of B. rapa var. )
  (rapeseed or coleseed flowering-stalks, used like broccoli rabe)

Other leafy vegetables
 Spinach

Onion family
Vegetables in the onion family are called  in Japanese.
  – type of chives
  – Chinese chives or garlic chive
 
  – formerly thought a variety of scallion, but geneticists discover it to be a cross with the bulb onion (A. × wakegi).
 Green onions or scallions
  – Often used to denote the types as thick as leeks used in Kantō region, but is not a proper name of a cultivar, and merely taken from the production area of Fukaya, Saitama. In the east, the white part of the onion near the base like to be used.
  ("multipurpose scallion") – young plants.
  – Kyoto cultivar of green onion.
  – Cultivar named after Shimonita, Gunma.
  – Allium macrostemon, collected from the wild much like field garlic.
  – Allium victorialis, much like ramps.

Root vegetables
 – Chinese artichoke, Stachys affinis
 – Japanese radish
 – Arctium lappa
Lotus root
Potato
 Sweet potato
 Taro and stalk
  – Kyoto variety
  – stems available fresh or dried; their tartness must be boiled off before use.
 – bamboo shoots
  – vital condiment to ramen, made from the Taiwanese giant bamboo (Dendrocalamus latiflorus) and not from the typical bamboo shoot.
  – vague name that can denote either Dioscorea spp. (Japanese yam or Chinese yam) below. The root is often grated into a sort of starchy puree. Also the tubercle used whole.
The name  refers to roots dug from the wild.
  (D. opposita) – In a strict sense, refers to the long truncheon-like form.
  (D. opposita) – A fan-shaped (ginkgo leaf shaped) variety, more viscous than the long form.
  (D. polystachya var.) – A round variety even more viscous and highly prized.
  – edible tubercles
  – lily bulbs

Sprouts
 – radish sprouts
 – mung sprouts
 Soybean sprouts

Specialty vegetables
Aralia cordata – "Japanese spikenard"
 –a type of butterbur, both stalk and young flower shoots
  – dried gourd strips
  –  
  – a term for wild-picked vegetables in general, including fernbrake, bamboo shoots, tree shoots

Pickled vegetables
  – term for Japanese pickles.

Nuts
 Ginkgo nuts
 Azuki bean
  – chestnuts
  – Japanese walnut (Juglans ailantifolia)
  – a type of buckeye or horse chestnut (Aesculus turbinata)
  – acorns of Castanopsis spp.

Seeds
 Sesame seeds
 Black sesame seeds
 White sesame seeds
  seeds
 Wild sesame seeds
 Hemp seeds – mixed in with 
  – usually powdered mustard, or in paste tubes
  – Zanthoxylum piperitum

Mushrooms
 
 
 
 
 
 
 Shiitake
 
 Wood ear
 Rhizopogon roseolus

Seaweed

  – Campylaephora hypnaeoides
  – Petalonia binghamiae
 
  – kombu, kelp
  or  – thin shavings of kelp
  – a thin sheet of kelp created as a byproduct
  – the thick, pleated portion near the attached base of the seaweed
 
 Nori
  – refers to seaweed harvested from sea-rock.
 
 
  – Aphanothece sacrum, a Kyushu specialty

Fruits

Citrus

 – a new hybrid

Yuzu

Other

Akebia (sausage fruit)

Loquat
 – a traditional type of melon
Nashi pear
Persimmon
 – Myrica rubra

Soy products

Soy sauce (light, dark)

 – soy sprouts
 – soy meal

Vegetable proteins
  – wheat gluten
  – fresh  usually sold in sticks (long bars)
 Dry  – variously shaped and colored.  is one variety
 – somewhat more doughy (still has starches left)
Tofu
Soft:  (silken), 
Firm:  (cotton)
Freeze-dried: 
Residue: 
Soy milk

Animal sources

Eggs
 Chicken
 Quail egg
 Terrapin eggs, sea-turtle eggs

Meats
 Beef
 Kobe beef
 Matsusaka beef
 Mishima beef
 Beef tongue, heart, liver, tripe, rumen, omasum, abomasum
 Chicken – called  in Western parts (Kansai). There are various heritage breeds called 
 Nagoya cochin
 Shamo – fighting cock
  –  × Rhode Island red
 Unlaid egg yolk
 Pork
  (Berkshire (pig))
  – a domestic pig × wild boar crossbreed
 Whey  – marketed by 
 Horse meat, sometimes called  – a delicacy.

Finned fish

Marine fishes
 (red-fleshed fish or akami zakana)
skipjack tuna (katsuo) - made into tataki, namaribushi, and processed into katsuobushi
 
tuna (maguro)
Japanese amberjack (buri / hamachi)
Spanish mackerel (sawara)

Blue-backed fish
These fish are collectively called ao zakana in Japanese.
Japanese jack mackerel (aji)
pacific saury (sanma)
sardine (iwashi)
 Niboshi or iriko is dried sardine, important for fish stock and other uses.
mackerel (saba)
 or kohada (Konosirus punctatus)
herring (nishin)
 aji (Japanese horse mackerel and similar fish) - typical fish for hiraki, or fish that is gutted, butterflied, and half-dried in shade.

White-fleshed fish
These fish are collectively called shiromi zakana in Japanese.
flatfish (karei / hirame) - ribbons of flesh around the fins called engawa are also used. Roe is often stewed.
pike conger (hamo) - in Kyoto-style cuisine, also as high-end surimi.
pufferfish (fugu) - flesh, skin, soft roe eaten as sashimi and hot pot (tecchiri); organs, etc. poisonous; roe also contain tetrodotoxin but a regional specialty food cures it in nuka until safe to eat.
tilefish (amadai) - in a Kyoto-style preparation, it is roasted to be eaten scales and all; used in high-end surimi.
red sea bream (madai) - used widely. the head stewed as kabuto-ni.

Freshwater fish
ayu - the shiokara made from this fish is called .
Japanese eel (unagi)
 - refers regionally to different fish, but often the goby type, some are high-end fish.
salmon (sake) - shiojake or salted salmon are often very salty fillets, so lighter salted amajio types may be sought.  is salt-cured whole fish.  uses snout cartilage.
suzuki
 (Family Salangidae)
 nigoro buna (Carassius auratus grandoculis) - vital source of funazushi for Shiga-kennians

Marine mammals
 
baleen whale (kujira)
dolphin (iruka)

Mollusks

Squid and cuttlefish
These fish are collectively called ika in Japanese.
 (aori ika)
 (surume ika)
 (kensaki ika)
 (yari ika)
 (hotaru ika)
 (kō ika)

Octopus
Octopus is called tako in Japanese.
 Common Octopus (madako)
 Giant Pacific Octopus (mizudako)
 Amphioctopus fangsiao (iidako)

Bivalves
scallop (hotate-gai)
littleneck clam (asari)
freshwater clam (shijimi)
oyster (kaki)
 iwagaki (Crassostrea nippona), available during summer months.
clam (hamaguri)
 (akagai)
 (aoyagi)
 Geoduck (mirugai)
 (torigai)

Single shelled gastropods and conches
 horned turban (sazae)
 abalone

Crustaceans
These foods are collectively called ebikani-rui or kokaku rui in Japanese.

Crab
Crab is called kani in Japanese.
 snow crab (zuwaigani)
 horsehair crab (kegani)
 king crab (tarabagani; hanasaki gani=Paralithodes brevipes)
 horse crab (gazami)
 Kona crab (asahi-gani)

Lobsters, shrimps, and prawns
These shellfish are collectively called ebi in Japanese.
 spiny lobster (ise-ebi)
 Kuruma prawn (kuruma ebi)
 humpback shrimp (botan ebi; Pandalus hypsinotus)
 mantis shrimp - (shako)
 barnacle
  (Palaemon paucidens) - freshwater

Echinoderms
 Sea cucumbers (namako) - body, intestines (konowata), ovaries (kuchiko, konoko)
 Sea urchin (uni), ovaries

Tunicates
 Sea pineapple (hoya)

Roe
salmon roe (ikura)
herring roe (kazunoko)
mullet roe  (karasumi) - similar to botargo
pollock roe  (tarako (food))
capelin roe  (masago)
flying fish roe (tobiko)
 crustacean eggs

Liver
 ankimo, or monkfish liver.
  (Thread-sail filefish) and abalone livers are used as is, or as kimo-ae, i.e., blended with the fish flesh or other ingredients as a type of aemono.
 squid and katsuo (skipjack) livers and guts, used to make shiokara.

Processed seafood
 anchovy (katakuchi-iwashi),  dried to make Niboshi. The larvae are shirasu and made into Tatami iwashi
 chikuwa
 himono (non-salted dried fish) - some products are bone dry and stiff, incl. ei-hire (skate fins), surume (dried squid), but often refer to fish still supple and succulent.
 kamaboko, satsuma age, etc., comprise a class of food called nerimono, and are listed under surimi products.
 niboshi
 shiokara of various kinds, made from the guts and other portions.

Insects

, larvae and pupae of kurosuzumebachi or yellowjacket spp.
, tsukudani made from locusts that infest rice fields. It used to be pretty common wherever rice was grown.
, tsukudani made from stonefly and caddisfly larvae in streams (specialty of Ina, Nagano area).

See also
 List of Japanese cooking utensils
 List of Japanese dishes
 List of Japanese condiments
 List of sushi and sashimi ingredients 
 Sansai

Ingredients

Japanese